Elvis Kholwana Siwela is a South African politician who has been an African National Congress Member of the National Assembly of South Africa since 2019, and previously from 2014 to 2017.

Background
Siwela earned a master's degree in Public Management from Regenesys Business School. He served on the provincial executive committee (PEC) of the African National Congress in Mpumalanga.

Parliamentary career
In 2014 he was elected to the National Assembly of South Africa from the ANC's Mpumalanga list. Siwela was appointed to serve on the Portfolio Committee on Telecommunications and Postal Services and the Portfolio Committee on Higher Education and Training. In September 2017, he resigned from the National Assembly.

Siwela was elected back to the National Assembly in the May 8, 2019 general election. He was then appointed to the Portfolio Committee on Basic Education. In October 2019, he questioned whether the grade 9 certificate should be issued to all pupils and at what cost. In August 2021, he became a member of the Portfolio Committee on Health.

References

Living people
Year of birth missing (living people)
Place of birth missing (living people)
African National Congress politicians
Members of the National Assembly of South Africa